Silibil N' Brains are a Scottish hip-hop duo consisting of Gavin Bain and Billy Boyd (not to be confused with Scottish Billy Boyd (actor)). They are best known for masquerading as American rappers from California to secure a record deal, a story which formed the basis of Bain's 2010 memoir California Schemin' (later reprinted as Straight Outta Scotland) and was adapted into the documentary film The Great Hip Hop Hoax.

History
In the early 2000s, Bain and Boyd were working together in Scotland, but found that the idea of Scottish rap was not taken seriously in London. After being dismissed as "rapping Proclaimers" during auditions because of their accents, they decided to take on American identities, pretending to be from San Jacinto in California. They created the personas of Silibil (Boyd, a play on "silly Bill" and "syllable") and Brains McLoud (Bain).

Under their new identity, they were more successful at getting attention in London. They moved to the city and secured live work. They rapidly got management with Jonathan Shalit and later a record deal with Sony Music UK for two singles and an album. The pair worked on recording material and continued to perform live, including opening for D12, and appearing on MTV. Their Scottish identity was known only to a small circle.

However, Sony's merger and subsequent job losses left them without supporters in the record company and their planned first single was delayed for at least 6 months as the label focused on other acts. Boyd had got married and his wife, still in Scotland, was expecting a child. With work having dried up, he left the group, moving back to Scotland, and getting work in the oil industry.

Bain continued performing as Brains on a smaller scale. He subsequently came out and revealed the hoax.

The duo subsequently reunited and released an EP in October 2013 called Dirty Rotten Scoundrels. They also uploaded unreleased material from their original 1998-2005 run to Bandcamp.

Bain released his solo album Almost Dead Famous on 4 July 2015.

Discography 
 "Play With Myself" (2004, promotional single)
 Dirty Rotten Scoundrels (2013)

References

External links
Storyville - The Great Hip-Hop Hoax

Musical groups established in 1998
Musical groups disestablished in 2005
Musical groups reestablished in 2013
Scottish male rappers
Scottish musical duos
Scottish hip hop groups
Hip hop duos
Musical hoaxes
Male musical duos